The Gallions Reach Crossing is a proposed River Thames crossing close to Gallions Reach in East London, running between Beckton in the London Borough of Newham and Thamesmead in the Royal Borough of Greenwich. Originally a proposed ferry crossing replacing the Woolwich Ferry, later plans suggested either a bridge or a tunnel. It is being developed in conjunction with the Belvedere Crossing, just downriver.

History
The crossing was announced as a ferry route by the Mayor of London, Boris Johnson, in 2012 following the cancellation of the Thames Gateway Bridge, with a proposed operation date of 2017. Subsequent reports suggesting a bridge or a tunnel have put the opening date around 2025.

The ferry crossing would have replaced the Woolwich Ferry, with similar operational periods (currently 6:10am to 8:00pm weekdays), given that the current ferry's infrastructure is reaching the end of its serviceable life. Capacity would have been doubled to 300 vehicles per hour in each direction. The promoters claimed that it would alleviate traffic congestion in the Woolwich area, which suffers from a mix of local and cross-ferry traffic.

Alternatives
In addition to the proposed ferry, TfL suggested in 2013 a bridge or a tunnel as an alternative option. This would be a two lane crossing catering for local traffic, and would not be expected to open until after 2021. This would require an additional £30m of capital to service the Woolwich Ferry in the interim period.

In 2015, TfL announced that the bridge or tunnel plans were more likely to go ahead, and invited the public for their views. The crossing would be tolled, and contain two lanes of traffic each way, one dedicated to buses. TfL also suggested the Docklands Light Railway could be extended to Thamesmead or Abbey Wood as part of the works.

Advocacy

Both Jim Fitzpatrick, MP for Poplar and Limehouse, and Stephen Timms, MP for East Ham, have expressed support for a bridge in this location, rather than a ferry.

See also
List of crossings of the River Thames
Silvertown Tunnel
Belvedere Crossing
Thames Gateway Bridge

References

River Thames ferries
Proposed rail infrastructure in London
Bridges across the River Thames
Bridges in London
Proposed bridges in the United Kingdom